The 2016 Korean Tour was the sixth season of the Korean Tour to carry Official World Golf Ranking points. Starting in 2016, each event is worth a minimum of nine points, up from six points previously. The season consists of 12 events, three of which were co-sanctioned by the OneAsia Tour or the Asian Tour. All the tournament had prize funds of at least 300 million won (approximately US$290,000). Five had prize funds of 1 billion won ($960,000) or more.

Schedule
The following table lists official events during the 2016 season.

Order of Merit
The Order of Merit was based on prize money won during the season, calculated using a points-based system.

Notes

References

External links
English-language version of official Korea PGA site 

2016 Korean Tour
2016 in golf
2016 in South Korean sport